It's Gonna Rain is a composition by Steve Reich

It's Gonna Rain may also refer to:

 "It's Gonna Rain", song by Sonny and Cher, B-side
 "It's Gonna Rain", 1970 song by Bobby Womack
 "It's Gonna Rain", song and single by Violent Femmes
 "It's Gonna Rain!", Japanese song by Bonnie Pink
 "It's Gonna Rain", a song by Take 6 first released on their 1994 album, Join the Band